Maud Duplomb, (born 31 October 1985 in Annonay) is a professional squash player who represents France. She reached a career-high world ranking of World No. 62 in July 2012.

References

External links 

French female squash players
Living people
1985 births
People from Annonay
Sportspeople from Ardèche
21st-century French women